Drakaina (born August 28, 1975) is a French actress and model. The name, Drakaina, means "she dragon" in Greek. When Drakaina and artist Ariock were talking about Echidna, the mother of all monsters, he mentioned that she was a "Drakaina", and she instantly knew that it would be her name.  Drakaina is a registered trademark belonging to Drakaina since 2001.

Biography

Early life
Drakaina was born in Vincennes, France. Her father, Gilles, is a retired restaurant owner and her mother, Catherine, is a breeder of Pyrenean Mountain Dogs.  Drakaina began her acting career after being spotted in a club. Beforehand, she had been working as a receptionist and been a model for an international hair product company CAPIRELAX. She is best known for her career as a fantasy art model, working with over 340 international painters and comic book artists.

Career
Since 2001, Drakaina has appeared in a number of French magazines which include Playboy, Verites, Khimairia, and New Look, as well as television/radio productions on TF1, Europe1, and France3. She became Ariock's spokesmodel and has been recognized as France's first ever fantasy art model. She had a supporting role in the 2001 TV film, Sa mère la pute. In August 2006, Drakaina relocated to Canada where she is now pursuing her acting career.

Drakaina has been Ariock's spokesmodel since 2001. She also appeared in the 2006 Heavy Metal calendar as a December angel by Lorenzo Sperlonga. She worked with Ariock and Spanish comic artist Mike Ratera on a comic book based on her character, which was later dropped due to conflicting schedules. She was approached by Red Sky Comics to portray the comic book character Warrior Queen but didn't follow suit.

Additionally, she was approached in February 2006 by PETA France to become one of their official spokesmodels.

In 2006, she worked on the Outlander (2007)  set starring James Caviezel and Jack Huston.

In 2008, she was given by askmen.com the title of #2 Fantasy art Model worldwide and released her first European art book, "Drakaina Fantasy of Desires".

In 2010, Drakaina was nominated for Faces Magazine Awards in the "Babe the Year" category, and was one of the guests of honor at Hal-Con, one of the largest science fiction conventions in Eastern Canada, where she presented the first issue of the comic book of her image, "Drakaina Untamed". The comic was a huge success, so much that it sold out in 48 hours. Late 2010 saw the release of her 3rd art book, "Drakaina Masters", by SQP Editions, which received an excellent reception from the public, encouraging Drakaina to attend many meetings and book signings with her fans.

Personal life
Drakaina lives in Toronto, Ontario. From 2006 to 2016, she lived in Halifax, Nova Scotia, pursuing her modeling career. Prior to 2006 she lived in Avignon, France. She lived with French artist and concept designer Ariock, whom she met in 2001 when he was looking for his spokesmodel, and their shiba inu Beltane. Drakaina and Ariock separated in early 2010.

Selected appearances

Interviews & articles
The science, the fiction and the fantasy, Fantasy model Drakaina Muse to launch new book, 10/2010
“Dreaming about Drakaina”, by Sue Carter Flinn, 10/2010
Interview with Drakaina - the Fantasy Art Muse, 03/2010
Interview de Drakaina(fr) - GameKult, 07/2010
French fantasy model finds Bedford a dream, 12/2008
Interview, 2006, Aliens Café
Article on Drakaina, from "Fantasy Magazine », italy

References

External links

Drakaina.com The official website.
Drakaina's diary

External videos
"Drakaina: first ever Fantasy art Model from France", French documentary on Drakaina, TF1, 2005
Extract from the french movie Sa mere la pute

1975 births
Living people
French expatriates in Canada
French film actresses
French television actresses
People from the Halifax Regional Municipality
People from Vincennes